Ağbulaq (known as Alçalı until 2015) is a village in the Kalbajar District of Azerbaijan.

References 

Populated places in Kalbajar District